Suresh Ishwar Wadkar (born 7 August 1955) is an Indian playback singer. He performs in both Hindi and Marathi films. He has sung songs in some Bhojpuri films, Odia albums and bhajans and in Konkani films.

He was awarded the Sangeet Natak Akademi Award for 2018 for Sugam Sangeet. In 2020, the Government of India honoured him with the Padma Shri.

Early life and musical training
Wadkar was born in Kolhapur in a middle-class family that soon moved to Girangaon. His father Ishwar Wadkar worked in cloth mills and his mother cooked food for the mill workers. In youth, he wrestled at akhadas and frequented the Talwalkar gym with his father, who was also a wrestler.

In 1968, when Wadkar was 13, Jialal Vasant encouraged him to work towards the "Prabhakar" certificate offered by the Prayag Sangit Samiti, because it was equivalent to a BEd and qualifies the awardee to teach professionally. Wadkar successfully completed his "Prabhakar" and joined Arya Vidya Mandir in Mumbai as a music teacher.

Singing career
Though groomed for Indian classical music, Wadkar entered the Sur-Singar competition in 1976. He won the competition which was judged by composers from the Indian film industry including Jaidev and Ravindra Jain. Ravindra Jain introduced him to the world of playback singing, and Wadkar sang Jain's composition Sona Kare Jhilmil Jhilmil Vrishti Pade Tapur Tupur in the film Paheli (1977). Jaidev also offered him the song "Seene Mein Jalan" in the film Gaman (1978).

At the time, Lata Mangeshkar was so impressed with his voice that she strongly recommended him to film personalities including Laxmikant–Pyarelal, Khayyam and Kalyanji-Anandji. Laxmikant-Pyarelal, impressed with his voice, soon recorded a duet with Lata, "Chal Chameli Bagh Mein" for Krodhi (1981). Soon after, he was given the opportunity to perform for songs in Hum Paanch, Pyaasa Sawan ("Megha Re Megha Re") and above all, his turning point in films – Raj Kapoor's Prem Rog (1982). After that, Wadkar sang many songs under the R. K. Banner, and he often gave his voice for Rishi Kapoor in Heena, Prem Granth, Bol Radha Bol, Vijay and others. He also sang for Rajiv Kapoor in Ram Teri Ganga Maili. Two of his most famous songs are "Tum Se Milke" from Parinda (1989) and "Aye Zindagi Gale Laga Le" from Sadma (1983).

Wadkar sang his first Tamil song in the 2009 film Kanden Kadhalai, an adaptation of the Hindi blockbuster Jab We Met. The song is a ghazal type song called "Naan Mozhi Arindhaen".

He has sung numerous devotional songs in various Indian languages for many denominations including many Vaishnav and Shaivite sampradayas such as the Swaminarayan Sampradaya.

In 1996, Wadkar sang Channeache Rati among several other songs in Rajendra Talak's Konkani album Daryachya Deger with Asha Bhosle.

Marathi music career
Suresh Wadkar has worked with some of the top class Marathi music directors like Pt.Hridaynath Mangeshkar, Sudhir Phadke, Shrinivas Khale, Shridhar Phadke, Vasant Desai, Ashok Patki, Anil-Arun etc.

Other work
In 2002, Wadkar produced the film "Tanman.com".

In 2003, he collaborated with arist Shivanand (Udayraj A. Gadnis) on Cosmic Raga Mandal project.

He was a judge on the Indian TV singing show Sa Re Ga Ma Pa L'il Champs and at the 2005 Sangeet Awards.

In 2022, he was the judge for Zee TV's devotional music reality show Swarna Swar Bharat along with Kumar Vishwas and Kailash Kher.

Music schools
He has also started an online music school, called SWAMA (Suresh Wadkar Ajivasan Music Academy), under Ace Open University.

Personal life
Wadkar is married to classical singer Padma and the couple has two daughters, Ananya and Jiya.

Awards

In 1976, Wadkar won the Madan Mohan Best Male Playback Singer Award at the Sur-Singar competition. He is also a recipient of the 2004 Lata Mangeshkar Puraskar instituted by Madhya Pradesh government. He also won the 2007 Maharashtra Pride Award which is given by the government of Maharashtra to citizens of note. He got awarded by Late Sadashiv Amarapurkar Award 2017 by Ahmednagar's Think Global Foundation.

He was awarded the Sangeet Natak Akademi Award for 2018 for Sugam Sangeet. On January 25, 2020, his name was announced for Government of India's fourth highest civilian honour, the Padma Shri, for his work in the field of arts.

National Film Awards

Wins 

 2010 – Best Male Playback Singer – "Hey Bhaskara Kshitijavari Ya" (Mee Sindhutai Sapkal)

Filmfare Awards 
He, along with KK, holds the record for most number of nominations for the Filmfare Award for Best Male Playback Singer without even winning.

Nominations 

 1983 – Best Male Playback Singer – "Mein Hoon Prem Rogi" (Prem Rog)
 1983 – Best Male Playback Singer – "Meri Kismat Tu" (Prem Rog)
 1986 – Best Male Playback Singer – "Main Hi Main Hoon" (Ram Teri Ganga Maili)
 1990 – Best Male Playback Singer – "Lagi Aaj Sawan Ki" (Chandni)
 1991 – Best Male Playback Singer – "O Priya Priya" (Dil)
 1997 – Best Male Playback Singer – "Chappa Chappa Charkha Chale" (shared with Hariharan) (Maachis)

Collaborators
Suresh Wadkar has sung for a variety of composers in the Indian film industry. These include:

 Shrinivas Khale (Marathi)
 Shridhar Phadke (Marathi)
 Anil-Arun
 Laxmikant Pyarelal
 Kalyanji Anandji
 R.D. Burman
 Ilayaraja
 Ravindra Jain
 Bappi Lahiri
 Khaiyyam
 Usha Khanna
 Arun Paudwal
 A.R. Rahman
 Vidyasagar
 Nadeem-Shravan
 Vishal Bhardwaj
 Rajesh Roshan
 Raamlaxman
 Shiv-Hari
 Jatin–Lalit
 Hridaynath Mangeshkar
 Shridhar Phadke
 Anand–Milind
 Anu Malik
 Himesh Reshammiya
 Shanker
 Ravi
 Chitragupta
 Rajkamal
 Jaidev
 Mohinderjit Singh
 Brahma Kumaris
 Kaushal Inamdar
 Dr Swaroop Roy

Filmography

 Mumbai-Pune-Mumbai 2 (2015)
 Haider (2014)
 Kahin Hai Mera Pyar (2014)
 Yeh Khula Aasmaan (2012)
 7 Khoon Maaf (2011)
 Kanden Kadhalai (2009) (Tamil)
 Ghauttham (2009) (Kannada)
 Kaminey (2009)
 Ek Vivaah... Aisa Bhi (2008)
 Omkara (2006)
 Vivah (2006)
 Bal Ganesh (2006)
 Naam Gum Jaayega (2005)
 Indra (2002)
 Hu Tu Tu (1999)
 Sar Utha Ke Jiyo (1998)
 Satya (1998)
 Lahoo Ke Do Rang (1997)
 Bhai (1997)
 Maachis (1996)
 Muqaddar (1996)
 Prem Granth (1996)
 Rangeela (1995)
 Ghatak (1995)
 Udhaar Ki Zindagi (1994)
 Aaina (1993)
 In Custody (1993)
 Lootere (1993)
 Kayda Kanoon (1993)
 Sangeet (1992)
 Parampara (1992)
 Dil Aashna Hai (1992)
 Ghar Jamai (1992)
 Vansh (1992)
 Thalapathi (1991)
 Lamhe (1991)
 Lekin... (1991)
 Henna (1991)
 Kurbaan (1991)
 Aaj Ka Samson (1991)
 Patthar Ke Phool (1991)
 The Blow (1991)
 Shiva (1990)
 Dil (1990)
 Maha-Sangram (1990)
 Parinda (1989)
 Bhrashtachar (1989)
 Toofan (1989)
 Purani Haveli (1989)
 Chandni (1989)
 Hero Hiralal (1988)
 Waaris (1988)
 Hero Hiralal (1988)
 Libaas (1988)
 Thikana (1987)
 Hifazat (1987) directed by Prayag Raj
 Imaandaar (1987)
 Saveray Wali Gaadi (1986)
 Ram Teri Ganga Maili (1985)
 Lallu Ram (1985)
 "Bihari Babu" (1985)
 Utsav (1984)
 Sadma (1983)
 Masoom (1983)
 Disco Dancer (1982)
 Prem Rog (1982)
 Maine Jeena Seekh Liya (1982) (first Hindi movie music composition by Nadeem-Shravan)
 Pyaasa Sawan (1981)
 Hum Paanch (1980)
 Gaman (1978)
 Paheli (1977)

Devotional
 Omkar Swarupa Jai Shri Swaminarayan Sai Tum Yaad Aye Sai Naam Ek Rang Anek Sampoorana Geeta-Hindi Shiva Chalisa Gururaya Aathvito Tujhiye Paaya Om Namah Shivaya Mantra Namo Namaha He Pramukh Swami Koti Koti Vandan Kariye Swaminarayan Charan Kamalama Parabrahma Tame He Purushottam''

References

External links

 Ajivasan Music Academy
 

Living people
1955 births
Indian film score composers
Indian male film score composers
Indian male playback singers
Indian television presenters
Indian Hindus
Performers of Hindu music
Bollywood playback singers
Marathi playback singers
Marathi-language singers
Konkani-language singers
Bhojpuri playback singers
Odia playback singers
Tamil playback singers
Musicians from Mumbai
Singers from Mumbai
Film producers from Mumbai
People from Kolhapur
Best Male Playback Singer National Film Award winners
Recipients of the Padma Shri in arts
Recipients of the Sangeet Natak Akademi Award